Chew Sin Huey (Shi Xin Hui; ; born 23 June 1981), also known as Sing Chew, is a Malaysian-born former singer based in Singapore, who was one of the five popular new talents emerged from the Channel U's popular singing talent show, Project SuperStar 2005 in Singapore.

Early life and education 
Shi studied at S.R.J.K (C) Kuo Kuang and Foon Yew High School. She then studied at National University of Singapore and majored in Chinese Studies and Political Science.

Career 
She was also involved in campus performances and took up the lead role of a musical and also held a mini concert when she was studying at the National University of Singapore. She had also taken part in Malaysia's popular talent search contest, Astro Talent Quest in the year 2004.

Shi was made popular in Singapore as the first runner-up in the female category of Project Superstar 2005, a singing-cum-talent search competition organised by Channel U of Mediacorp, Singapore. She had garnered the highest points (with the highest score of 44/50 from the judges) during the female finals from her delivery of three songs and received positive comments from the judges panel. However, she lost on a popularity voting system which totals up to 70% of the overall score. Despite missing the top spot in the competition,'s singing talent is widely appreciated and she has been offered a singing contract by Play Music which is now part of Warner Music.

Shi also made many appearances on TV, including her participation in a local Mandarin idol drama Dream Chasers as one of the female lead. Other TV appearances of include her hosting a game show that was being shown on channel U, The 7-eleven game show, where she is the leader of one of the four teams in the show and each team's objective is to eliminate the other teams by arriving at the designated 7-eleven convenience store and play the games. She also appears on a local talk/debate show, Cross Fire, where she showcases her verbal talents and well-structured opinions on social issues which invite guests to voice out their opinion on a particular topic, and as well as Let's Shoot! and also in music oriented variety show like Music in the Air.

Her debut album 从台北到北京 consist of four original tracks, five covers and a cover duet with Tan. She even penned the lyrics for her album's no. 1 hit, 从台北到北京 / From Taipei To Beijing (which is a cover of popular Danish group, Infernal's "From Paris to Berlin"). The song 从台北到北京 was an instant hit with the listeners and became popular as ringtone downloads and received frequent airplay on radio stations as well as in pubs or night hangouts because of its strong rhythmic techno nature. Her music video for the song From Taipei To Beijing  became a hot topic in local newspapers and the online community after a 25-second video was leaked onto the popular video sharing website, YouTube. The video had more than 40,000 hits and she made a stunning return from her reclusion from the industry after almost one year of hiatus while she has been preparing for her debut album. It was shocking for those who had always regarded her as the girl next door because of her demure looks and her plain dress sense and could not accept this major change. Following her debut release, she also became more confident, pretty and fashionable and has shown to critics that she has better fashion sense now after vicious remarks and criticisms were directed at her during her competition days. She was also hailed as Singapore's version of popular and sexy Japanese singer, Kumi Koda by her record company. Her popularity in Singapore landed her on the cover of a few magazines and many other magazine articles and spreads. Her immense popularity even as a debut singer made her the talk of the town for quite a while. Although there is a shift of focus onto her music video and her dressing, the album received good feedback from music professionals and media where most reviews gave her at least 3/5 stars with some as high as 4.5/5 stars because of her steely and emotive delivery which is rare for a newcomer. It also achieved good sales results especially for a newcomer and thus proving her popularity not just in Singapore but also the Malaysia regions. Shi was also ranked as top five Asian pop singer and top five personalities in 2006 by Singapore's premier and most prestigious English newspaper, The Straits Times together with the likes of Asian superstars David Tao and Andy Lau.

However Shi feels that she still needs to improve on many aspects and is set to move on to other regions of the Chinese community like Taiwan and China of which the album title, 从台北到北京 / From Taipei To Beijing, had vividly shown her ambitious vision to take over the Chinese music industry by storm. For her debut album, adopted an English name, Sing. It reflects her passion for singing, sounds like her romanized name, Sin Huey (Xin Hui), and indicates the fact that she is from Singapore.

Before this release, she had also lent her vocals to numerous Mediacorp soundtracks, drama theme songs and compilations. The drama theme and sub-theme songs that she sang for Mediacorp were later released as her personal compilation. It was a great success as the compilation clinched the top position of sales in renowned music stores like CD-Rama and Sembawang Music, indicating that the sales results were good.

Born and raised in Malaysia, Shi has not forget about her roots after starting her music career from Singapore. She has returned multiple times to her alma mater, Foon Yew High School and has also performed in a charity concert on its very soil.

Her ability in singing was further recognised as she won the Best Newcomer award in Singapore Hits Award, a prestigious award ceremony for Chinese musicians all over the world.

Events and milestones 
18 August 2005 – First female runner-up after garnering the highest points 44/50 from professional judges from local big scale competition Project Superstar, which was judged accordingly with 70% of total score from public votes & 30% from professional judges
18 October 2005 – Signed a three-year contract with Play Music Singapore
30 November 2006 – Debut album 从台北到北京 released
10 December 2006 – Star Awards nominee for Best Newcomer, Top 10 Female Artiste and Best Theme Song (The Rainbow Connection)
16 December 2006 – First ever album autograph session at Bugis Junction
30 December 2006 – Voted by The Straits Times as top five Asian pop and top five personalities
27 January 2007 – Island-wide airing of the music video 你给的 on channel U
2 March 2007 – Released celebratory version of debut album 从台北到北京
24 March 2007 – Island-wide airing of the music video 昨天 on channel U
14 September 2007 – Compilation of drama theme songs, The BestDrama, released
2007 – Nominated in Top 11 for Most Outstanding Malaysia Artiste by Malaysia Radio 988
27 October 2007 – Nominated for Best Newcomer, Most Popular Newcomer, Most Popular Female Artiste in 2007 Singapore Hits Award
27 October 2007 – Awarded the Best Newcomer in Singapore Hits Award 2007
26 December 2008 – Second album 女皇 Queen released
February 2009 – 女皇 Queen limited edition album released

Personal life 
Shi married Swedish husband Anders Stenquist in 2016. They both have a child.

Filmography

Television

Discography

Rank of songs on music charts

Awards and nominations

References

External links 
 
Debut album introduction at Warner Music Singapore
Repackaged album version introduction at Warner Music Singapore
Photo gallery-

1981 births
Living people
Malaysian composers
Lyricists
Malaysian people of Chinese descent
Malaysian Mandopop singers
People from Johor
National University of Singapore alumni
21st-century Singaporean women singers